Szczepański (feminine Szczepańska, plural Szczepańscy) is a Polish surname. It may refer to:
 Aneta Szczepańska (born 1974), Polish judoka
 Bernard Szczepański (1945-2018), Polish wrestler
 Henryk Szczepański (1933-2015), Polish footballer
 Jan Szczepański (boxer) (1939-2017), Polish boxer
 Jan Szczepański (sociologist) (1913-2004), Polish sociologist
 Jan Alfred Szczepański (1902–1991), Polish film and theatre critic
 Józef Szczepański (1922-1944), Polish poet
 Krzysztof Szczepański, Polish canoer
 Miłosz Szczepański, Polish footballer
 Piotr Szczepański (born 1988), Polish canoer
 Robert Szczepański (born 1975), Polish strongman
 Wiesław Szczepański (born 1960), Polish politician

Polish-language surnames
Patronymic surnames